Longford was a constituency represented in the Irish House of Commons until 1800.

Members of Parliament

1692–1801

Notes

References

                                                                                                                                                                                                                          

Historic constituencies in County Longford
Constituencies of the Parliament of Ireland (pre-1801)
1800 disestablishments in Ireland
Constituencies disestablished in 1800